
You're the Best Thing That Ever Happened to Me is a 1973 studio album by Dean Martin, arranged by Ernie Freeman and Larry Muhoberac, and produced by Jimmy Bowen.

Bowen returned to the country pop format that he had abandoned for Martin's previous album, and included Traditional pop standards, R&B songs, and an Italian song. Four of the songs, "I'm Confessin' (That I Love You)", "Baby Won't You Please Come Home," "I Don't Know Why," and "Gimme a Little Kiss, Will Ya, Huh?", had previously appeared on his 1964 album Dream with Dean.

It was reissued on CD by Hip-O Records in 2009.

Reception

William Ruhlmann on Allmusic.com gave the album two and a half stars out of five. Ruhlmann said that "The idea, it seemed, was to try a little everything, and Martin, as usual, was game. But he really needed to have displayed such versatility earlier".

Track listing 
 "Free to Carry On" (Burton Dale Bobbitt, Jim Brady) - 2:42
 "You're the Best Thing That Ever Happened to Me" (Jim Weatherly) - 4:00
 "I'm Confessin' (That I Love You)" (Doc Daugherty, Al J. Neiburg, Ellis Reynolds) - 3:08
 "Amor Mio" (Sammy Cahn) - 2:43
 "You Better Move On" (Arthur Alexander) - 2:23
 "Tie a Yellow Ribbon Round the Old Oak Tree" (L. Russell Brown, Irwin Levine) - 2:47
 "Baby Won't You Please Come Home" (Charles Warfield, Clarence Williams) - 2:28
 "I Don't Know Why" (Fred E. Ahlert, Roy Turk) - 2:53
 "Gimme a Little Kiss, Will Ya, Huh?" (Maceo Pinkard, Jack Smith, Roy Turk) - 2:38
 "Get On with Your Livin'" (Ted Hamilton) - 2:48

Personnel 
 Dean Martin – vocals
 Ernie Freeman - arranger	
 Larry Muhoberac
 Jimmy Bowen - record producer
John Guess - audio engineer
Tom Perry
Ricci Martin - photography

References

1973 albums
Dean Martin albums
Albums arranged by Ernie Freeman
Albums arranged by Larry Muhoberac
Albums produced by Jimmy Bowen
Reprise Records albums